Places in Mexico called La Purísima:
La Purísima, Durango (Tepehuanes Municipality)
La Purísima, Guanajuato (Tarandacuao Municipality)
La Purísima, Jalisco

See also
La Purísima Concepción (disambiguation)
Purísima